Lars Eskeland (6 March 1867 – 30 September 1942) was a Norwegian educator and writer, and proponent for Nynorsk.

Personal life
Eskeland was born at Stord as the son of farmers Øystein Larsson Eskeland and Mari Larsdotter Vatna, and was a brother of Severin Eskeland. He married Marta Nerhus in 1893. He was uncle of Ivar Eskeland.

Career
Eskeland co-founded the Voss Folk High School at Voss in 1895, and served as long-term principal and teacher at this school. Among his students were several later well known writers, including Tarjei Vesaas, Sjur Bygd, Tore Ørjasæter, Olav Sletto and Ragnvald Vaage. He wrote a total of about sixty books or other publications.
He was decorated Knight of the Order of St. Olav in 1935. In 1949 a statue of Eskeland was unveiled in Voss.

References

1867 births
1942 deaths
People from Stord
Heads of schools in Norway
Norwegian male writers